Angelos Karatasios (born 22 June 1997) is a Greek professional footballer who plays as a centre back for Egaleo.

References

External links
 
 
 
 

1997 births
Living people
Greek footballers
Football League (Greece) players
Gamma Ethniki players
Super League Greece players
Super League Greece 2 players
Vataniakos F.C. players
Pierikos F.C. players
Niki Volos F.C. players
Tyrnavos 2005 F.C. players
Athlitiki Enosi Larissa F.C. players
Olympiacos F.C. players
Apollon Larissa F.C. players
Diagoras F.C. players
Egaleo F.C. players
Liga II players
SSU Politehnica Timișoara players
Association football defenders
Footballers from Katerini
Greek expatriate footballers
Expatriate footballers in Romania
Greek expatriate sportspeople in Romania